The United States Olympic team trials in diving are held before every Summer Olympics to select the participators for the USA's diving team. The event is overseen by the United States Olympic Committee and run by USA Diving.

Venues
1984 - Indianapolis, Indiana 
1988 - Indianapolis, Indiana 
1992 - Indianapolis, Indiana 
1996 - Indianapolis, Indiana 
2000 - Weyerhaeuser King County Aquatic Center - Federal Way, Washington 
2004 - St. Peters, Missouri
2008 - Indianapolis, Indiana 
2012 - Weyerhaeuser King County Aquatic Center - Federal Way, Washington from June 17 to June 24, 2012 
2016 - Indianapolis, Indiana June 2016
2020 - Indianapolis, Indiana June 6–13, 2021

See also
Diving at the Summer Olympics

References

External links 
USA Diving: 2012 U.S. Olympic Team Trials - USA Diving

Diving competitions in the United States
Dive